General Cheng Sayavong is a general of the Lao People's Armed Forces and head of the Mountainous Areas Development Company (MADC). He is one of the most powerful men in Laos, though he has not been known to dabble in national politics. 

Cheng Sayavong served as Vice Minister of Commerce and Tourism and Chairman of the National Tourism Authority.

References 
 Brett Dakin: Another Quiet American, Asia Books 2003

Lao People's Revolutionary Party politicians
Year of birth missing (living people)
Living people
Government ministers of Laos